Jeremy Gillam (born August 2, 1976) is an American politician and lobbyist. A Republican, he was a member of the Arkansas House of Representatives before resigning to work for the University of Central Arkansas. He serves as the university's Director of Governmental Affairs and External Relations. He represented District 45. He has a bachelor's degree from Arkansas State University.

He served in the Arkansas House from 2011 to 2017. He is a Baptist. He left office to work as a lobbyist for the University of Arkansas in 2018.

References

1976 births
21st-century American politicians
Arkansas State University alumni
Living people
Republican Party members of the Arkansas House of Representatives
University of Arkansas at Little Rock people